Fu Cheong is one of the 25 constituencies in the Sham Shui Po District of Hong Kong which was created in 2003.

The constituency loosely covers Fu Cheong Estate with an estimated population of 18,766.

Councillors represented

Election results

2010s

2000s

References

Constituencies of Hong Kong
Constituencies of Sham Shui Po District Council
2003 establishments in Hong Kong
Constituencies established in 2003
Nanchang